SendGrid (also known as Twilio SendGrid) is a Denver, Colorado-based customer communication platform for transactional and marketing email. The company was founded by Isaac Saldana, Jose Lopez, and Tim Jenkins in 2009, and incubated through the Techstars accelerator program.
As of 2017, SendGrid has raised over $81 million and has offices in Denver, Colorado; Boulder, Colorado; Irvine, California; Redwood City, California; and London.

The company went public with a debut in the New York Stock Exchange on November 16, 2017. Twilio acquired SendGrid in February 2019.

General
SendGrid provides a cloud-based service that assists businesses with email delivery. The service manages various types of email including shipping notifications, friend requests, sign-up confirmations, and email newsletters. It also handles Internet service provider (ISP) monitoring, domain keys, sender policy framework (SPF), and feedback loops. Additionally, the company provides link tracking, open rate reporting. It also allows companies to track email opens, unsubscribes, bounces, and spam reports.
Beginning in 2012, the company integrated SMS, voice, and push notification abilities to its service through a partnership with Twilio.

SendGrid offers a freemium version and a Lite Plan (pay-as-you-go), as well as three expanded levels of service: Essentials, Pro, and Premier.

SendGrid's clients include Uber, Twilio, Foursquare, Pandora, and Airbnb.

Controversy
The controversial firing of Adria Richards in March 2013 and the surrounding circumstances became known as Donglegate.

Funding
Before SendGrid was called Twilio SendGrid, they named the project smtpapi.com. After founding SendGrid in Riverside, California, in July 2009, Saldana, Lopez, and Jenkins enrolled the startup in the TechStars accelerator program and moved the company to Boulder, Colorado. By December 2009, the company announced it had raised $750,000 in a funding round led by Highway 12 Ventures. Other participating investors included SoftTech VC, FF Angel, and TechStars founder David Cohen.

In April 2010, the email software-as-a-service (SaaS) company received $5 million in Series A round funding from Foundry Group, SoftTech VC, and Highway 12 Ventures, as well as individual investors including David Cohen, Scott Petry, Dave McClure, and Matt Mullenweg. Ryan McIntyre, the co-founder of Foundry, joined SendGrid's board of directors at this time as well.

In January 2012, SendGrid raised $21 million in Series B funding. The funding round – led by Bessemer Venture Partners and previous investors Highway 12 Ventures, Foundry Group, 500 Startups, and TechStars – occurred concurrently with a new partnership between SendGrid and Microsoft’s Windows Azure platform.

In December 2014, SendGrid raised $20 million in Series C funding. The series C round was led by new investor Bain Capital Ventures. Current investors Bessemer Venture Partners and Foundry Group also participated.

In November 2016, SendGrid raised $33 million in Series D funding. The round was led by Bain Capital Ventures, with participation from Bessemer Ventures and the Foundry Group.

Growth and development

The company announced in May 2011 that it had sent out over 9 billion emails for more than 23,000 companies since its founding. In the same month, SendGrid announced a partnership with web host service Rackspace Hosting that allows Rackspace users to launch email campaigns using SendGrid's software.

By January 2012, the service reported that it was sending out 2.6 billion personalized emails per month. By March, the company was experiencing 10% monthly growth.

SendGrid announced in June 2012 that it was working with 60,000 businesses and had sent out a total of 45 billion emails since its start in 2009.

On July 25, 2012, the company reported it had partnered with platform-as-a-service (PaaS) companies CloudBees, Heroku, and Engine Yard. The company opened its Denver office the following October.

In December 2012, SendGrid teamed up with Twilio to incorporate SMS and push notification services to its platform. The company announced integrations with Parse, Windows Azure, and StackMob the same month.
In April 2013, SendGrid announced it had sent over 100 billion emails. That June, the company released its new email marketing service. The service allows marketing professionals and non-technical users to create emails using various newsletter templates and features a drag-and-drop template to fill in content.

Former Citrix executive Sameer Dholakia joined SendGrid as the CEO in September 2014. 

In October 2017, SendGrid was ranked #13 in Fortune's list of The 50 Best Workplaces in Southern California.

In December 2017, SendGrid announced that they are processing around 36 billion emails per month.

In October 2018, Twilio announced plans to acquire SendGrid for $2 billion.

In December 2018, a SendGrid shareholder filed a lawsuit in Colorado federal court in response to the planned acquisition.

Twilio completed its acquisition of SendGrid on February 1, 2019.

Since the acquisition in 2019, a growing number of customers have complained about support response time, leading to a large amount of negative reviews.

References

External links
 

Software companies established in 2009
American companies established in 2009
2009 establishments in Colorado
Software companies based in Colorado
Companies based in Boulder, Colorado
Companies formerly listed on the New York Stock Exchange
Email marketing software
Companies based in Denver
2017 initial public offerings
Go (programming language) software
2019 mergers and acquisitions
Software companies of the United States